Lathyrus grandiflorus, two-flowered everlasting pea, is a species of flowering plant in the family Fabaceae, native to southern Europe. Unlike its cousin, the annual sweet pea (Lathyrus odoratus), it is unscented. Once established it is a robust plant with the ability to scramble into other shrubs and trees.

In the UK it has gained the Royal Horticultural Society’s Award of Garden Merit.

References

grandiflorus